The following is a list of mainland Chinese films first released in 2008. There were 80 Chinese feature films released in China in 2008.

Highest-grossing films
The following are the 10 highest-grossing Chinese films released in China in 2008.

Films released

See also 
 2008 in China

References

External links
IMDb list of Chinese films

Lists of 2008 films by country or language
Films
2008